Live at the Five Spot and variants thereof usually refer to releases of performances recorded at the Five Spot Café in New York, including:

Thelonious Monk: Complete Live at The Five Spot 1958
Thelonious Monk: At the Five Spot (Thelonious Monk album)
Thelonious Monk: Live at the Five Spot: Discovery!
Pepper Adams: 10 to 4 at the 5 Spot (Riverside, 1958)
Kenny Burrell: On View at the Five Spot Cafe (Blue Note, 1959)
Randy Weston: Live at the Five Spot (Randy Weston album) (1959)
Eric Dolphy: At the Five Spot, Volumes 1 & 2
Eric Dolphy: Memorial Album: recorded live at the Five Spot (1961)
Joey DeFrancesco: Live at the 5 Spot